This is a list of aircraft in alphabetical order beginning with 'Q'.

Q

QinetiQ 
 QinetiQ Zephyr

Qingting 
 Qingting-5
 Qingting-6

Quaissard
(Gaston Quaissard)
 Quaissard GQ.01 Monogast

Quander
(UL Flugzeugbau Quander, Petershagen, Germany)
Quander Airpfeil
Quander Micropfeil

Quasar
(Dolní Bečva, Czech Republic)
Quasar 2000
Quasar Flavio
Quasar Relief
Quasar Tramp

Queen 
(Queen Aeroplane Co (Fdr: Willis McCormick), 197 St & Amsterdam Ave, Bronx Park, NY)
 Queen 1911 Monoplane
 Queen Aeroboat
 Queen Twin Monoplane
 Queen-Martin

Quénard
(Georges Quénard)
 Quénard 50

Quest Aircraft 
 Quest Kodiak

Questair 
(Questar Inc (Pres: James E Griswold), Greensboro, NC)
 Questair Venture

Quick 
(Joseph & William Quick, Huntsville, AL)
 Quick 1908 Monoplane

Quick 
(Quick Aeroplane Dusters, Houston, TX)
 Quick Special

Quickie
(Quickie Aircraft Corp (founders: Tom Jewett & Gene Sheehan), Mojave, CA)
 Rutan Quickie
 Quickie Q2
 Quickie Q200
 Quickie Free Enterprise a.k.a. Big Bird
 Super Quickie Q2

Quicksilver 
(Quicksilver Manufacturing)
 Quicksilver GT400
 Quicksilver GT500
 Quicksilver MXL II SPORT
 Quicksilver SPORT 2S
 Quicksilver MX II SPRINT
 Quicksilver MX SPRINT
 Quicksilver MX SPORT
 Quicksilver MX II Sport

Quikkit
 Quikkit Glass Goose

Quinn 
(E Quinn, Roebuck, SC)
 Quinn Sport

References

Further reading

External links

 List of aircraft (Q)